Aryono Miranat (born 27 April 1964) is a retired badminton player from Indonesia who specialized in mixed doubles. After his retirement he became a badminton trainer at PB Djarum in Kudus. As of 29 December 2007, he is a coach in the men's doubles category for the Indonesian badminton association (PBSI). He is currently the Indonesia national team men's doubles assistant coach.

Career 
Miranat competed at the 1989 Southeast Asian Games in Kuala Lumpur, won two silver medals in the mixed doubles and team events, also a bronze in the men's doubles. He was part of the Indonesia winning team at the 1989 Sudirman Cup, helping the team defeat South Korea in group 1A, where he played in the mixed doubles with Minarti Timur by beating Park Joo-bong and Chung Myung-hee in straight games.

Miranat won several international titles in the early 1990s with Eliza Nathanael, including the China (1992), Thailand (1992), Hong Kong (1992), and French (1993) Opens. He was a mixed doubles runner-up three consecutive years (1990–1992) at the Indonesia Open. He was also runner-up at the 1993 Hong Kong Open with Risyeu Rosalina. Miranat earned a bronze medal with Nathanael at the 1993 IBF World Championships in Birmingham, England. He was also part of the Indonesian Men's team that earned a bronze medal at the 1990 Asian Games in Beijing, China.

After retiring, he chose to become a badminton coach. Before becoming a male doubles assistant coach at PBSI, he was first trusted to handle the women's doubles sector in the Indonesian national training center at Cipayung. At his coaching hand the formation of the pair Vita Marissa and Liliyana Natsir was initiated, who were able to penetrate the women doubles dominance of China at that time.

As a coach, expressing his normal calm figure, he is usually called "Koh Ar" by his students. He already has numerous achievements as a national coach for PBSI including the gold medal earned by the Indonesian men's badminton team at the 2003 Southeast Asian Games and many individual doubles titles.

Achievements

World Championships 
Mixed doubles

World Cup 
Mixed doubles

Asian Cup 
Mixed doubles

IBF World Grand Prix 
The World Badminton Grand Prix sanctioned by International Badminton Federation (IBF) since 1983.

Mixed doubles

 IBF Grand Prix tournament
 IBF Grand Prix Finals tournament

Invitational tournament 
Men's doubles

References

External links 
 Page at PB Djarum
 
 

1964 births
Living people
Sportspeople from Bandung
Indonesian male badminton players
Badminton players at the 1990 Asian Games
Asian Games bronze medalists for Indonesia
Asian Games medalists in badminton
Medalists at the 1990 Asian Games
Competitors at the 1989 Southeast Asian Games
Southeast Asian Games silver medalists for Indonesia
Southeast Asian Games bronze medalists for Indonesia
Southeast Asian Games medalists in badminton
Badminton coaches
Indonesian Roman Catholics
20th-century Indonesian people
21st-century Indonesian people